Oyster Bay, previously known as Siu Ho Wan in proposals, is an MTR station on the  to be constructed southwest of Siu Ho Wan depot in Siu Ho Wan, on Lantau Island. The station will be built at-grade around existing Tung Chung line tracks. The construction of the station was gazetted by the Hong Kong Government in June 2021. The station is expected to open for service in 2030, with the depot remaining in use.

It is expected that the station will serve new properties surrounding Siu Ho Wan depot, of which the station will be named after.

History 
As part of the Airport Core Programme for the new Hong Kong International Airport, land was reclaimed at Siu Ho Wan for a MTR depot to service  and  trains. The depot opened in 1998. 

Discussion about a new station and transit-oriented development at the Siu Ho Wan site were first discussed in the mid 2000s, in conjunction with the Hong Kong–Zhuhai–Macau Bridge. The 2007 Concept Plan for Lantau proposed that the site would be used for a logistics hub.

In the mid 2010s, news reports noted that the site would be developed for housing, and a new station built to serve the site. In 2016, Leung Chun-ying announced in the 2016 Policy Address that the Government was working with MTR Corporation regarding future development sites, including at Siu Ho Wan Depot. 

In 2020, Carrie Lam announced in the 2020 Policy Address that the Government had completed the Zoning Plan for the site, working with MTR. It was estimated that around 20,000 residential units could be provided on the site. In December 2021, MTR's proposal for the site was approved by the Town Planning Board. The  site will be developed in four phases, delivering 10,720 private flats and 10,480 public flats (mostly subsidised sale), as well as a  shopping mall. 

In September 2022, MTR announced that a land exchange with Government for public housing has been accepted, and that a project agreement for the construction of Oyster Bay station had been agreed. MTR noted that construction of that station would begin in 2023, and would open in 2030. The Siu Ho Wan depot would remain in operation throughout construction, as it serves the Airport Express and Tung Chung lines.

Station layout
The platform layout will be similar to the Tung Chung line section of Nam Cheong station, with two additional tracks and two side platforms to be constructed aside of the two existing tracks for Tung Chung line service. Its concourse will be built above Siu Ho Wan depot and the platform level.

References

Proposed railway stations in Hong Kong
MTR stations in the New Territories